Thomas Alfred Coward  (8 January 1867 – 29 January 1933), was an English ornithologist and an amateur astronomer. He wrote extensively on natural history, local history and Cheshire.

Life
He was born at 8 Higher Downs, Bowdon, Cheshire (now Greater Manchester) on 8 January 1867, the fourth and last child of Thomas and Sarah Coward. His father was a Congregational minister and in business as a partner in the firm of Melland and Coward, textile bleachers. Coward's siblings were Charles, Alice and Annie.

After an education at Brooklands School, Sale and at Owens College (now Manchester University), Coward worked in the family business for 19 years, before it was taken over by the Bleachers' Association. His share of the proceeds from the sale of Melland and Coward was sufficient to allow him to retire from business and concentrate on his love of wildlife and the study of birds, which had developed as a child. He began writing articles on natural history for newspapers including The Liverpool Daily Post, The Chester Cournant and The Manchester Guardian for which he wrote the "Country Diary" column until his death. General interest magazines for which he wrote included The Field and Country Life and in specialist journals such as The Zoologist, Proceedings of the Zoological Society of London and British Birds.

His first book was The Birds of Cheshire, published in 1900, when he was living in Hale. His three-volume The Birds of the British Isles and their eggs (1920–25) was illustrated by Archibald Thorburn and was "acknowledged as being the book that did more to popularise the study of birds than any other publication produced during the first part of the twentieth century". It was revised by Arnold Boyd for a new edition in 1950.

He co-wrote articles and books on ornithology with Charles Oldham, a former schoolmate.

He married his cousin Mary Milne in 1904. There is a Blue Plaque at his former home, Brentwood Villa, 6 Grange Road, Bowdon, to which he moved in 1911.

On his death, the  Cotterill Clough Nature Reserve  was bought, by public subscription, in his honour.

His field notes are archived in the Department of Zoology at Oxford.

Jizz 

Coward is credited with the first use in print of the term "Jizz", in his "Country Diary" column of 6 December 1921 - the piece was subsequently included in his 1922 book "Bird Haunts and Nature Memories". He attributed it to "a west-coast Irishman".

Positions

 Acting Keeper of the Manchester Museum (During World War I)
 Chairman and President of the Altrincham and District Natural History and Literary Society
 President of the Manchester Literary and Philosophical Society from 1921 to 1923

Bibliography

Coward wrote a number of books on local history, natural history and birds:
The Birds of Cheshire, 1900, written jointly with Charles Oldham.
Picturesque Cheshire
The Vertebrate Fauna of Cheshire and Liverpool Bay, 1910, written jointly with Charles Oldham and James Johnstone.
 
The Migration of Birds, Cambridge University Press, 1912
The Birds of the British Isles and their Eggs, Frederick Warne & Co, 1919 in two volumes, expanded to three in 1926
Bird Haunts and Nature Memories, Frederick Warne & Co, 1922
Birds and their Young
Life of the Wayside and Woodland
Birds at Home and Abroad
Life of Birds
Bird and Other Nature Problems, Frederick Warne & Co, 1931
Cheshire – Traditions and History
The Mammalian Fauna of Cheshire

Contributions
The Practical Handbook of British Birds, Witherby & Co, 1920
 (Foreword)

References

External links

 
 
 
 
 The Birds of the British Isles and Their Eggs Google Books. Retrieved 11 June 2011.
 Guardian 'Country Diary' columns

1867 births
1933 deaths
English nature writers
English ornithologists
People from Cheshire
Fellows of the Royal Entomological Society
Fellows of the Zoological Society of London
Manchester Literary and Philosophical Society